Josser may refer to:

 Josser Watling (born 1925), English footballer
 Jimmy Josser, a character played by Ernie Lotinga in a series of British comedy films and shorts (1928–1934?) and on the stage
 British slang for a cretin or simpleton